Rubina Kuraoka (born 17 October 1987 in Berlin) is a German voice actress.

Dubbing roles (excerpt) 
My Little Pony: Friendship Is Magic (Rarity)
Yu-Gi-Oh! Duel Monsters (Anzu Mazaki)
Wow! Wow! Wubbzy! (Wubbzy)
Ruby Gloom (Ruby)
iCarly (Carly Shay)
The Promised Neverland as Ray (young)
Made in Abyss (Nat)

Audiobooks (excerpt) 
2016: Finding Dory (German audiobook title: Findet Dorie), Publisher: der Hörverlag - 
2018: Karen Cleveland: Wahrheit gegen Wahrheit, Publisher: der Hörverlag, 
 2021: Claire Douglas: Beste Freundin - Niemand lügt so gut wie du (among others with Lisa Bitter and Beate Himmelstoß), publisher: Der Hörverlag,

External links

Rubina Kuraoka at the German Dubbing Card Index

1987 births
Living people
German voice actresses
German people of Japanese descent